Andrea Pastore (born 14 June 1994) is an Italian professional football player who currently plays for Miami United FC in the National Premier Soccer League.

Club career
He played for Bari until the age of 17, then moved to Serie A Tim club Robur Siena in order to play the Campionato Primavera 1. 
He signed his first contract and was loaned to Lega Pro Seconda Divisione team U.S. Borgo a Buggiano 1920, where he made 29 appearances and scored 1 goal.

He made his Serie C debut for Pontedera on September 1, 2013 in a game against Grosseto, collecting 25 appearances and scoring 2 goals. After two consecutive seasons of high quality performances, he was bought by Serie B team Trapani Calcio signing a 2-year contract. He will make his debut with Serse Cosmi as head-coach during an away match against Livorno.

On August 7, 2018, he signed a two-year contract with Serie C club Virtus Francavilla, where he collected 33 appearances and managed to score up to 5 goals and 5 assists under the management of head-coach Antonio Calabro, helping his team reach the historical Lega Pro 2016-2017 Promotion Playoffs milestone.

In July 2017 he signed a three-year contract with U.S. Alessandria Calcio 1912, where he participated in winning the Coppa Italia Lega Pro  .

He later joined Akragas Calcio for a 5 months loan, collecting 14 appearances and scoring a goal.

In August 2018 he returned to Virtus Francavilla, where he played 25 games, scoring one goal.

Ending his contract later that year, he was called to train  with one of the biggest teams in Morocco, Wydad AC, close to signing a multi-year deal before the CAF Champions League final against Espérance Sportive de Tunis.

On 20 September 2019 he joined Lecco under the supervision of coach Gaetano D'Agostino.

In November 2021, he moved to National Premier Soccer League team Miami United FC. During an International Friendly Match  against Liga Mexicana de Futbol Champions C.F. Pachuca, he managed to score a brace for the 3-0 win.

References

External links
 

1994 births
Sportspeople from the Metropolitan City of Bari
Footballers from Apulia
Living people
Italian footballers
A.C.N. Siena 1904 players
U.S. Città di Pontedera players
Trapani Calcio players
Forlì F.C. players
U.S. Alessandria Calcio 1912 players
S.S. Akragas Città dei Templi players
Virtus Francavilla Calcio players
Calcio Lecco 1912 players
Serie B players
Serie C players
Association football defenders